Ashraf Brik (born June 29, 1973) is a full professor at the Schulich Faculty of Chemistry at the Technion Institute of Technology, Israel.
His laboratory specializes in developing synthetic methods for chemical synthesis of proteins with post-translational modifications (PTMs) in quantities that allow for them to be studied thoroughly. Brik's group is developing novel modulators based on small molecules, peptides and peptidomimetics, to influence enzymes (such as deubiquitinases) and proteins involved in various diseases. With the help of these tools, it is possible to understand how molecules and biological systems affect health.

Early life and education
Brik, one of ten children, was born and raised in Abu Snan in northern Israel.
He received a bachelor's degree in chemistry from Ben-Gurion University of the Negev, a master's degree in chemistry from the Technion. He studied for his doctoral degree, in which he focused on research of chemical synthesis of proteins, from a joint course of the Technion and the Scripps Research Institute under the mentorship of Professor Chi-Huey Wong.
Brik authored the thesis “Design and Synthesis of Novel Catalytic Proteins Based on Polypeptide Scaffolds”, under the supervision of professor Ehud Keinan (Technion) and professor Phillip Dawson (The Scripps Research Institute).
He was promoted to senior researcher in 2004. He developed the synthesis of glycoproteins. In addition, Brik was involved in projects related to the discovery of inhibitors of various enzymes such as HIV protease.

Career
In 2007 Brik joined the Department of Chemistry of Ben Gurion University of the Negev. In 2011 he was promoted to associate professor and in 2012 to full professor. In 2014, Brik moved to the Technion Institute of Technology, where he holds the Jordan and Irene Tark Chair. 
Brik has coauthored more than 120 publications in key periodicals: Science, Nature Chemistry, Nature Chemical Biology, Nature Protocols, Journal of the American Chemical Society, Angewandte Chemie, Chemical Society Reviews, Chemical Science and others. Brik is a member of advisory and editing boards of a number of periodicals, including Cell Chemical Biology, ChemBioChem and Organic and Biomolecular Chemistry. He has also registered 6 patents.

The research efforts of Brik's group are budgeted by many foundations, including the European Commission's Horizon 2020 Program, which recently awarded him the ERC Advanced Grant.

Research
Posttranslational modification of proteins affects protein structure, function, stability and sub-cellular localization, making the process crucial to health and disease. Yet understanding the effects of these modifications at the molecular level has been hindered by the lack of homogeneously modified proteins obtained via traditional biochemical and molecular biology approaches. Moreover, the preparation of such complex bioconjugates at workable quantities is highly demanding. Recent advances in protein chemistry applying chemical and semisynthetic approaches are becoming increasingly beneficial to overcome these challenges. The Brik lab has been developing novel synthetic methods to prepare site-specifically modified proteins for biochemical, biophysical and functional analyses.

The Brik group is one of world leaders in devising new methods to prepare ubiquitin-based conjugates necessary for detailed studies on ubiquitin signaling. Ubiquitination is the cellular process where the 76 amino acid ubiquitin protein, or a polyubiquitin chain, is linked to a protein target, affecting a variety of biological processes such as protein degradation, trafficking, transcription and the DNA damage response. Not surprisingly, ubiquitination plays a key role in various diseases, such as neurological disorders, infectious diseases and cancer. In the face of challenges in producing ubiquitin conjugates using traditional molecular biology and enzymatic approaches,  the Brik lab has developed a number of novel chemical methods for the preparation of large quantities of highly homogeneous and pure ubiquitin conjugates which have shed light on the mechanisms of ubiquitin signaling and enabled the discovery of novel modulators for the enzymes involved these processes.

Honors & Awards
 2019:	ERC Advanced Grant
 2019: The ICI Prize for the Outstanding Scientist    
 2018:	Elected member of the Young Israel Academy
 2017:	The Michael Bruno Memorial Award
 2017:	The Henry Taub Prize for Academic Excellence
 2015:	Bessel Award of the Humboldt Foundation for 2015
 2015:	The 11th Hirata Award
 2013:	Teva Award for Excellence in memory of Eli Hurvitz
 2013:	The Tetrahedron Young Investigator Award in Bioorganic and Medicinal Chemistry for 2013
 2013:	Dean's Honors for Excellent Researcher (Faculty of Natural Sciences Ben-Gurion University)
 2012:	Ben-Gurion University - Toronto prize for excellence in research
 2011:	The 2011 Israel Chemical Society prize for Outstanding Young Chemist
 2009:	Dean's Honors for Excellent Researcher (Faculty of Natural Sciences Ben-Gurion University)

Recent articles
 2020: Examining the role of phosphorylation of p19 INK4d in its stability and ubiquitination using chemical protein synthesis. Muna Msallam, Hao Sun, Roman Meledin, Pauline Franz and Ashraf Brik. Chemical Science 2020, 11, 5526-5531
 2020: Gold (I)-Mediated Decaging or Cleavage of Propargylated Peptide Bond in Aqueous Conditions for Protein Synthesis and Manipulation. Muhammad Jbara, Emad Eid and Ashraf Brik. Journal of the American Chemical Society 142 (18), 8203-8210
 2020: Affinity Maturation of Macrocyclic Peptide Modulators of Lys48‐linked Diubiquitin by a Twofold Strategy. Yichao Huang, Mickal Nawatha, Ido Livneh, Joseph M. Rogers, Hao Sun, Sumeet K. Singh, Aaron Ciechanover, Ashraf Brik and Hiroaki Suga. Chemistry–A European Journal
 2020: Total Chemical Synthesis of ISGylated-Ubiquitin Hybrid Chain Assisted by Acetamidomethyl Derivatives with Dual Functions. Emad Eid, Gabor Boross, Hao Sun, Muna Msallam, Sumeet Singh and Ashraf Brik. Bioconjugate chemistry 31 (3), 889-894 
 2020: Examining Several Strategies for the Chemical Synthesis of Phosphorylated Histone H3 Reveals the Effectiveness of the Convergent Approach. Muhammad Jbara, Suman Kumar Maity and Ashraf Brik. Eur. J. Org. Chem. 2020, 3128–3132
 2019: The Journey for the Total Chemical Synthesis of a 53 kDa Protein. Hao Sun and Ashraf Brik. Accounts of chemical research 52 (12), 3361-3371
 2019: Palladium‐Mediated Cleavage of Proteins with Thiazolidine‐Modified Backbone in Live Cells. Guy Mann, Gandhesiri Satish, Roman Meledin, Ganga B. Vamisetti and Ashraf Brik. Angewandte Chemie International Edition 58 (38), 13540-13549
 2019: De novo macrocyclic peptides that specifically modulate Lys48-linked ubiquitin chains. Mickal Nawatha, Joseph Rogers, Steven M. Bonn, Ido Livneh, Betsegaw Lemma, Sachitanand M. Mali, Ganga B. Vamisetti, Hao Sun, Beatrice Bercovich, Yichao Huang, Aaron Ciechanover, David Fushman, Hiroaki Suga and Ashraf Brik. Nature chemistry 11 (7), 644-652
 2019: Mirroring Life's Building Blocks. Roman Meledin and Ashraf Brik. Cell chemical biology 26 (5), 616-619
 2019: Chemical Biology: Powerful Synergy Between Two Cultures. Ashraf Brik, Ehud Keinan. Israel Journal of Chemistry 59 (1-2), 3-6
 2019: Palladium‐Mediated Direct Disulfide Bond Formation in Proteins Containing S‐Acetamidomethyl‐cysteine under Aqueous Conditions. Shay Laps, Hao Sun, Guy Kamnesky, Ashraf Brik. Angewandte Chemie International Edition 58 (17), 5729-5733
 2019: Semisynthesis of ubiquitinated histone H2B with a native or nonhydrolyzable linkage. Michael Morgana, Muhammad Jbarab, Ashraf Brik, Cynthia Wolberger. Methods in Enzymology Volume 618, 2019, Pages 1–27
 2019: Diverse fate of ubiquitin chain moieties: The proximal is degraded with the target, and the distal protects the proximal from removal and recycles. Hao Sun, Sachitanand Mali, Sumeet Singh, Roman Meledin, Ashraf Brik, Yong Tae Kwon, Yelena Kravtsova-Ivantsiv, Beatrice Bercovich, Aaron Ciechanover. Proceedings of the National Academy of Sciences 116 (16), 7805-7812
 2019: FACT and Ubp10 collaborate to modulate H2B deubiquitination and nucleosome dynamics. Melesse Nune, Michael T Morgan, Zaily Connell, Laura McCullough, Muhammad Jbara, Hao Sun, Ashraf Brik, Tim Formosa, Cynthia Wolberger. Elife 8, e40988
 2019: Halogen Substituents in the Isoquinoline Scaffold Switches the Selectivity of Inhibition between USP2 and USP7. Ganga B. Vamisetti, Roman Meledin, Pushparathinam Gopinath and Ashraf Brik. ChemBioChem 20 (2), 282-286

References

External links
Asharf Brik at Technion
Asharf Brik at Google Scholar
"Every day I add knowledge to humanity - and it's an experience that only a few go through" (in Hebrew) at The Marker
From the small village in Israel to the summit of world research (in Hebrew) at Mako

1973 births
Israeli scientists
Israeli chemists
Israeli biochemists
Academic staff of Technion – Israel Institute of Technology
Living people